WHPL is a radio station licensed to West Lafayette, Indiana located at 89.9 MHz, channel 210, on the FM dial.  WHPL broadcasts at an effective radiated power of 2,000 watts directional with a tower located off U.S. Route 231 in rural south-central Tippecanoe county.  Studio and offices are located at WGNR's studios in Anderson, Indiana.

History
WHPL signed on in early 1993 featuring religious and inspirational programming featuring Bible teachings and music.  WHPL would become Lafayette's only FM religious station.  Until this point, Lafayette listeners had to tune to the AM dial to get their inspirational fix from First Assembly of God's 1410 WCFY.  WHPL would become the Lafayette area's only Christian radio station in 1998 when WCFY was sold to Artistic Media Partners and flipped to a secular news/talk format as WAZY.

Originally, the station was housed in West Lafayette just south of the Purdue University campus, but later moved to a business district on Lafayette's east side where it remained until Moody decided to network WHPL and sister station WIWC (in Kokomo) to their 50,000 watt Anderson station serving the Indianapolis metro, WGNR-FM 97.9.

Before WHPL was networked with WGNR, the station featured its own unique program schedule while occasionally simulcasting with WIWC, especially in the mornings.  The rest of the day featured a blend of Bible teaching, talk, and inspirational music.  In the late 1990s, the inspirational music was shelved in favor of Contemporary Christian music also known as CCM or Christian AC.  The same format continues to this day only with a stronger emphasis on music.

Simulcasters
 WGNR-FM  97.9  Anderson (serving Indianapolis)
 WFOF  90.3   Covington (serving Danville, IL and west-central Indiana)
 WIWC  91.7   Kokomo (serving north-central Indiana)
 WMBL  88.1    Mitchell (serving Bloomington and south-central Indiana)

External links
WGNR Website

HPL
Moody Radio
HPL